Ziemeri Parish is an administrative unit of Alūksne Municipality in the Vidzeme region of Latvia.

Towns, villages and settlements of Ziemeri Parish 

Parishes of Latvia
Alūksne Municipality
Vidzeme